Mimi Onuoha is a Nigerian American visual artist and academic based in Brooklyn, NY whose work examines the effect of data collection and technology on society.

Early life and education 
Onuoha majored in anthropology at Princeton University. She earned a Master’s degree from NYU’s Interactive Telecommunications Program.

Work 

Onuoha's work, including The Library of Missing Datasets, has explored the idea of "missing datasets," which she describes as "blank holes in otherwise data-saturated systems," for instance, information about citizen surveillance by the police. These gaps in modern data collection can both harm and help vulnerable communities. Onuoha points out that Google Maps lacks map data for Brazil's favelas, leaving out communities where more than a million people live. She is also interested in the effects of artificial intelligence and how people are classified and abstracted by data. Onuoha is the co-author of A People's Guide to AI with Mother Cyborg.

Onuoha has been a Fulbright-National Geographic Fellow and an artist in residence at Eyebeam Center for Art & Technology, Studio XX, Data & Society Research Institute, Columbia University’s Tow Center, and the Royal College of Art. She also taught at Bennington College. She is currently an adjunct professor at New York University and lives in Brooklyn.

References

External links 

Princeton University alumni
New York University alumni
American artists
American people of Nigerian descent
Living people
American women academics
Year of birth missing (living people)
21st-century American women